Teofil Lapinski (1827–1886) was a Polish military commander, writer, an activist against Russian imperialism and volunteer in the Circassian army during the Russo-Circassian War.

Life 
In 1862 Lapinski published a book, Mountain people of Caucasus and their struggle for freedom against Russia (originally in German, Die Bergvölker des Kaukasus und ihr Freiheitskampf), which is considered one of the early sources on ethnography of peoples of the Northern Caucasus and also contains considerable information on Russia-Georgian relations. At the time of publication, the book was one of the few sources on contemporary Georgia available in Western Europe.

Lapinski was born in Austria-held Galicia and got involved in the Polish struggle for independence. He participated in the Hungarian Revolution of 1848 and then he was fighting in Crimean War as a colonel in the Polish cavalry division of the Turkish army under command of Władysław Stanisław Zamoyski.

References

Activists of the Great Emigration
Generals of the January Uprising
Military personnel from Lviv
Recipients of the Cross of Independence with Swords
Polish memoirists
Polish journalists
1886 deaths
1827 births
North Caucasian independence activists
People of the Caucasian War
Circassian military personnel of the Russo-Circassian War
Polish independence activists